The  is an electric multiple unit (EMU) train type operated by the private railway operator Meitetsu in Japan since 2019.

A two-car version is designated as 9100 series.

9100 series
9100 series trains are formed as follows, with two cars per set.

Seven sets are on the active roster as of 15 June 2022.

9500 series
9500 series trains are formed as follows, with four cars per set.

Twelve sets are on the active roster as of 15 June 2022.

Interior 
The trains are equipped with CCTV cameras, multilingual passenger information displays, and free Wi-Fi.

History
Meitetsu announced the construction of four 9500 series commuter trains as part of their capital investment plan on 25 March 2019. One set was delivered from the Nippon Sharyo Toyokawa plant over 8 and 9 July 2019. Set 9501 was first tested at Maigi inspection center in early July 2019. Trial operation on the Nagoya Main Line began on 29 July 2019.

Sets 9501 and 9502 entered service on 1 December 2019.

9100 series trains entered service in January 2021.

Four 9500 series trainsets and a 9100 series trainset are due to be constructed as part of Meitetsu's investment plan for fiscal 2022.

References

External links

 Meitetsu website 

Electric multiple units of Japan
Nagoya Railroad
Train-related introductions in 2019

1500 V DC multiple units of Japan
Nippon Sharyo multiple units